Tun Muhammad bin Tun Ahmad, better known as Tun Sri Lanang, was the Bendahara (Grand Vizier) of the royal Court of Johor Sultanate who lived between the 16th and 17th centuries. He served under two Sultans of Johor, namely; Sultan Ali Jalla Abdul Jalil Shah II (1570–1597) and Sultan Alauddin Riayat Shah III (1597–1615) and also advisers to 3 Acheh sultans namely; Sultan Iskandar Muda (until 1636), Sultan Iskandar Thani (1636–1641) and Sultana Tajul Alam Safiatuddin Shah (1641–1675). He had two honorific titles throughout his lifetime; as the Bendahara of Johor, Bendahara Paduka Raja Tun Mohamad, while he was given the title of Orang Kaya Dato' Bendahara Seri Paduka Tun Seberang after settling in Aceh.

Early life and events in Johor

Tun Sri Lanang was born in 1565 in Seluyut, Johore, and was descended from Tun Tahir, a brother of Bendahara Tun Mutahir of Malacca. There are not many records about his period as Bendahara in Johore. However, during the rule of Sultan Alauddin Riayat Shah III, he shouldered a heavier burden on the affairs of the state as the Sultan is a weak ruler. He shared the responsibility with the Sultan's brother Raja Abdullah (later to become Sultan Abdullah Maayah Shah which reigns between 1615 and 1623).

During the period the Dutch were attacking the Portuguese for the port of Malacca. The Dutch signed a friendship treaty with the Johore Sultanate (in 1606) with Tun Sri Lanang as a representative. Tun Sri Lanang refused the Dutch request of helping the Dutch to blockade the port of Malacca preferring the Dutch do it themselves.

In 1612, at the request of Raja Abdullah to pen the Malay Annals to ensure " ... all the adat, the rules and the ceremonies of the Malay Sultans and Rajas to be heard by our descendants and is made known all utterances so that it may benefit them". At this time, under the orders of Sultan Alauddin Riaayat Shah, Tun Sri Lanang oversaw the editorial and compilation process of the Malay Annals, better known as Sejarah Melayu in Malay.

In 1613, Acheh attacked Johor and in the battle of Batu Sawar. Johore was defeated and the Royal Family and Tun Sri Lanang was captured and brought to Aceh. The Bendaharaship was continued by his descendants. His notable descendants include Bendehara Tun Habib Abdul Majid and the Raja Bendahara of johor-melaka.

Later life in Aceh

After a brief "reeducation" in Aceh, the Johor Royal Family was returned to Johor. Tun Sri Lanang elected to stay in Acheh. He became advisor to the third Sultan of Acheh and was bestowed an Acheh honorific title. He was awarded a personal fief in Samalanga, Aceh in 1613 and held the title Uleebalang of Samalanga. He died in 1659 in Samalanga.

Legacy

Some of Tun Sri Lanang's descendants ruled as the Uleebalang of Samalanga until 1949, when Indonesia was formed in the same year. Many of his descendants were fervent nationalists including the female warrior Pocut Meuligo, Teuku Muhammad Daud, Teuku Abdul Hamid Azwar and Teuku Hamzah Bendehara. Some of his descendants carry the "Bedahara" suffix to their names indicating their ancestry.

His legacy is not only the rewriting and compiling of the magnum opus "Sejarah Melayu" but also includes the strongly Islamic flavor of Samalanga. Samalanga is also known as "Kota Santri", or "Town of Medrassas" is the centre of Islamic propagation in Acheh until today. Samalanga was also among the last town to fall to the Dutch during the time of the last Sultan of Acheh, Sultan Muhammad Daud Shah and also one of his strongholds.

Places named in honour of Tun Sri Lanang

Buildings and Institutions

 Laman Tun Sri Lanang, Kota Tinggi
 Perpustakaan Tun Seri Lanang, Universiti Kebangsaan Malaysia
 Tun Seri Lanang Secondary School, former Secondary school in Singapore

Roads

 Jalan Persiaran Tun Sri Lanang, Johor Bahru
 Jalan Tun Sri Lanang, Malacca

Notes

References

 
 Haji Buyong bin Adil, Sejarah Terengganu, published by Dewan Bahasa dan Pustaka, Kementerian Pelajaran Malaysia, 1974
 
 

(Tun) Suzana (Tun) Othman, Institusi Bendahara; Permata Melayu yang hilang, 2002, 
 Winstedt, R. O, A History of Johore (1365–1941), (M.B.R.A.S. Reprints, 6.) Kuala Lumpur: Malaysian Branch of the Royal Asiatic Society, 1992,

Further reading
 Kwa, Chong Guan and Borschberg, Peter, eds., Studying Singapore before 1800, Singapore: NUS Press, 2018. https://www.academia.edu/8314032
 Borschberg, Peter, ed., Journal, Memorials and Letters of Cornelis Matelieff de Jonge. Security, Diplomacy and Commerce in 17th Century Southeast Asia, Singapore: NUS Press, 2015. https://www.academia.edu/4302783
 Borschberg, Peter, ed., Admiral Matelieff's Singapore and Johor, 1606-1616 Singapore: NUS Press, 2016. https://www.academia.edu/11868450
 Borschberg, Peter, ed., "Jacques de Coutre's Singapore and Johor", Singapore: NUS Press, 2015. . https://www.academia.edu/9672124
 Rouffaer, G.P., "Was Malaka Emporium vóór 1400 A.D. genaamd Malajoer? En waar lag Woerawari, Ma-Hasin, Langka, Batoesawar?", Bijdragen van het Koninklijk Instituut voor Taal-, Volk- en Letterkunde, 77 (1921): 1-174 and 359–604.

1565 births
1659 deaths
People from Johor
Acehnese people